Lucio de Risi (born 1953) is an Italian electrical engineer, founder and CEO of MEGA International Srl.

Biography 
De Risi's father and grandfather were shoemakers.

De Risi graduated with a degree in electrical engineering from the Politecnico di Napoli, nowadays University of Naples Federico II. In 1981 he received his Master's from the University of Pennsylvania, where he studied after being awarded a scholarship from the Fulbright Association, with the thesis entitled A System for a Total Matching of Stereo Pairs of Images.

After graduation De Risi started working for a small consulting firm in the software industry in Paris that was eventually acquired by Cap Gemini. He spun off the small firm from Cap Gemini and created MEGA International Srl.. He developed the company into a leading supplier of tools for business modeling, and enterprise architecture modelling.

Personal life 
While a student in Philadelphia, he met Véronique, his future wife. He moved to Paris with her and launched MEGA International in the French capital.

Selected publications 
 De Risi, Lucio. A System for a Total Matching of Stereo Pairs of Images. University of Pennsylvania (1981).

References 

1953 births
Living people
Italian computer scientists
Italian chief executives
University of Naples Federico II alumni
University of Pennsylvania alumni